A refugee travel document (also called a 1951 Convention travel document or Geneva passport) is a travel document issued to a refugee by the state in which they normally reside in allowing them to travel outside that state and to return there. Refugees are unlikely to be able to obtain passports from their state of nationality (from which they have sought asylum) and therefore need travel documents so that they might engage in international travel.

The 145 states which are parties to the 1951 Convention Relating to the Status of Refugees are obliged to issue travel documents to refugees lawfully resident in their territory.

Refugee travel documents are passport-like booklets. Their cover bears the words "Travel Document" in English and French (and often in the language of the issuing state), as well as the date of the convention: 28 July 1951.  The documents were originally grey, though some countries now issue them in other colours, with two diagonal lines in the upper left corner of the front cover.  Bearers enjoy certain visa-free travel privileges extended by signatories to the convention.

However, as a refugee travel document is not a regular national passport, some problems may be encountered by the holder from time to time, for example due to non-familiarity of airline staff with such documents.

Travel documents issued to refugees
 New Zealand Refugee Travel Document
 Estonian travel document for refugees
 U.S Refugee Travel Document (United States) visa not required for Germany, Netherlands, Belgium, Croatia, Slovenia, Slovakia, Hungary and Cyprus.
 Australian Convention Travel Document. This document by itself does not allow the bearer to return to Australia; for that, a separate visa must be obtained.
Swiss Travel Document

Limitations of a refugee travel document compared to a passport 
Refugee travel documents issued by the Government of Canada cannot be used for travel to the bearer’s country of citizenship, and a refugee travel document issued by another country is not treated as a valid passport for the purposes of obtaining an Electronic Travel Authorization to visit Canada. Given that bearers of refugee travel documents are not citizens of the issuing country they may need to apply for a visa before travelling to Canada.
Egyptian travel documents issued for Palestinian refugees are considered unacceptable travel documents for travel and entry to New Zealand, unless they include an entry visa allowing the holder to enter Egypt.

Gallery of Refugee Travel Documents

See also
 Australian Convention Travel Document
Refugee identity certificate
Travel document
1954 Convention Travel Document, for stateless persons
Certificate of identity, for stateless persons or others
Nansen passport, the predecessor of the refugee travel document

National non-citizen travel documents
 Canadian Certificate of Identity
 Japan Re-entry Permit
 Australian Certificate of Identity. This document by itself does not allow the bearer to return to Australia; for that, a separate visa must be obtained.

Footnotes

External links

Travel documents from Immigration, Refugees and Citizenship Canada
1951 Convention travel document Images from Passportland.com

Refugee travel documents
United Nations documents